Joseph Sylvester Casey (July 1, 1900 – April 3, 1989) was an American baseball pitcher in the Negro leagues. He played with the St. Louis Giants in 1920 and the Cleveland Tate Stars in 1921.

References

External links
 and Baseball-Reference Black Baseball stats and Seamheads

St. Louis Giants players
Cleveland Tate Stars players
1900 births
1987 deaths
20th-century African-American sportspeople
Baseball pitchers